June Constance Howden (2 July 1918 – 9 June 2007), also known as Judy Howden was a New Zealand aviator and one of five New Zealand women who joined the Air Transport Auxiliary (ATA) during World War Two.

Personal life 
She attended Waikato Diocesan School for Girls in Hamilton. Whilst attending the school she began taking flying lessons, and in 1936 gained her "A" Licence. In that same year, she also received the New Zealand Herald's Air Scholarship.

Military career 
At the outbreak of World War Two, Howden enlisted with the Women's Auxiliary Air Force, where she was posted as Airwoman of the Watch at 2 Elementary Flying Training School at Woodbourne. 

In December 1943, Howden travelled to England and joined the Air Transport Auxiliary. While serving with the ATA, she flew twenty-two different types of planes, including Spitfires, Fireflies, Barracudas, and Mustangs. Howden flew all over Britain, transporting mail, dispatches and medical supplies and ferrying new repaired and damaged aircraft between factories, assembly plants, active-service squadrons and airfields.

Having served two years in the ATA in Britain, June Howden returned to New Zealand January 1946. She gained a commercial pilot’s licence and worked for Waikato Aero Club for six years, it was here that she met her future husband Robert William Gummer. Bob Gummer, was a fellow pilot who served with the Royal New Zealand Air Force (RNZAF) in the Pacific during the Second World War. 

June Gummer died in 2007 aged 88.

References 

1918 births
2007 deaths
Air Transport Auxiliary pilots
New Zealand aviators
Women aviators
People educated at Waikato Diocesan School
New Zealand World War II pilots